Valentinas Mikelėnas (born 6 April 1958) is a Lithuanian lawyer, former Justice of the Supreme Court of Lithuania, and one of the most prominent Lithuanian civil law scholars at Vilnius University. Mikelėnas was the Head of the Drafting Group of the Civil Code of Lithuania in 1991. He is also one of the Founding Members of the European Law Institute, a non-profit organisation that conducts research, makes recommendations and provides practical guidance in the field of European legal development with a goal of enhancing the European legal integration.

External links 
Biography
Infolex 
CV
European Law institute

1958 births
Living people
Judges of the Supreme Court of Lithuania
Lithuanian legal scholars
Lawyers from Vilnius
Vilnius University alumni
Academic staff of Vilnius University
Scholars of tort law
Scholars of contract law
Scholars of comparative law
20th-century Lithuanian lawyers
21st-century Lithuanian lawyers